Rötz is a town in the district of Cham, in Bavaria, Germany. It is situated 17 km northwest of Cham, and 30 km east of Schwandorf.

References

Cham (district)